Hen and Chicken Islands is a small group of islands on Raquette Lake in Hamilton County, New York.

References

Islands of New York (state)